Johnny Reklai (July 1, 1948 – March 11, 2007) was a Palauan businessman and politician. He was elected as the President of the Senate of Palau in April 2005. He dies in a boating accident, at the time of his death he was serving as the President of the Senate of Palau. He was succeeded in that office by Surangel S. Whipps, and his seat was filled by Hokkons Baules.

He attended the University of Guam. He was first elected to the House of Delegates of Palau in 1980.

References

1948 births
2007 deaths
Presidents of the Senate of Palau
People from Ngarchelong
Palauan businesspeople
Members of the House of Delegates of Palau
20th-century businesspeople